The 1920 Rock Island Independents season was the American football franchise's thirteenth season and inaugural season in the American Professional Football Association (APFA). The Independents hosted first ever APFA/National Football League contest on September 26, 1920. After the AFPA had been formed on September 17, 1920, Douglas Park was the venue as the Independents hosted the St. Paul Ideals, winning 48-0 in the new league's first contest.

The Independents entered the season coming off a nine-win, one-loss, one-tie (9–1–1) record in 1919 as an independent team, which the team proclaimed to be the "Champions of the USA". After the 1919 season, several representatives from the Ohio League, another American football league, wanted to form a new professional league; thus, the APFA was created.

A majority of the team stayed from the 1919 team, including the coaching staff, but Keith Dooley was added to the roster. The Independents opened the season with a win against the St. Paul Ideals, a non-APFA team. This was the first game in the history of the APFA. The team played all but one game at their home field, Douglas Park, and ended the season with a 6–2–2 record, which placed the team tied-for-fourth in the league standings.

The sportswriter Bruce Copeland compiled the All-Pro list for the 1920 season. Fred Denfield, Dewey Lyle, and Ed Novak made the first-team; Obe Wenig and Ed Shaw made the second-team; and Walt Buland and Freeman Fitzgerald made the third-team. Of all the players on the roster, only Ed Healey has been enshrined in the Pro Football Hall of Fame.

Background 

The Rock Island Independents finished 9–1–1 in their 1919 season, claiming the National Championship. For the 1920 season, the Independents added multiple players to its roster: Keith Dooley, who previously played from 1912–1916; Fred Denfield, Mark Devlin, and Harry Gunderson, who previously played in 1917; Ed Healey, Polly Koch, George Magerkurth, Ed Shaw, Ben Synhorst, Harry Webber, Obe Wenig, and Arnie Wyman. The team lost Wes Bradshaw, Leland Dempsey, Al Jorgenson, Loyal Robb, Fats Smith, Red Swanson, and co-coach John Roche.

After the 1919 season, representatives of the Canton Bulldogs, the Cleveland Tigers, the Dayton Triangles, and the Akron Pros met on August 20, 1920, to discuss the formation of a new league. At the meeting, they tentatively agreed on a salary cap and pledged not to sign college players or players already under contract with other teams. They also agreed on a name for the circuit: the American Professional Football Conference. They then invited other professional teams to a second meeting on September 17.

At that meeting, held at Bulldogs owner Ralph Hay's Hupmobile showroom in Canton, representatives of the Rock Island Independents, the Muncie Flyers, the Decatur Staleys, the Racine Cardinals, the Massillon Tigers, the Chicago Cardinals, and the Hammond Pros agreed to join the league. Representatives of the Buffalo All-Americans and Rochester Jeffersons could not attend the meeting, but sent letters to Hay asking to be included in the league. Team representatives changed the league's name slightly to the American Professional Football Association and elected officers, installing Jim Thorpe as president. Under the new league structure, teams created their schedules dynamically as the season progressed, so there were no minimum or maximum number of games needed to be played. Also, representatives of each team voted to determine the winner of the APFA trophy.

Schedule

Game summaries

Week 1: vs. St. Paul Ideals 

September 26, 1920, at Douglas Park, Rock Island, Illinois

To start its 1920 season, the Independents played the first game in the history of the league against the non-APFA St. Paul Ideas. This was the Ideals' second game of the season, coming off a 14–7 victory the week prior. Coach Flanigan had Fred Chicken, Bobby Marshall, and Freeman Fitzgerald—the 1919 Independents' main stars—in reserve in case he needed to play them. The Independents shutout the Ideals, winning 48–0. Every touchdown by the Independents were rushing. In the first quarter, Ed Novak and Chicken both scored; Novak and Jerry Mansfield scored in the second quarter. The Independents scored 14 points in the third quarter with touchdowns from Ray Kuehl and Mansfield. In the final quarter, Kuehl scored the Independents' last points of the game.

Week 2: vs. Muncie Flyers 

October 3, 1920, at Douglas Park

Rock Island Independents played against the Muncie Flyers after their victory. It is considered to be one of the first games played with two APFA teams. The Columbus Panhandles played against the Dayton Triangles on the same day; however, in 1920, starting times were not standardized. Thus, it is unknown which of the two games started first. In the first quarter, the Independents scored three touchdowns: two from Arnold Wyman and one from Rube Ursella. In the second quarter, Ursella scored kicked a  field goal, and Wyman scored from an  kickoff return. In the third quarter, Sid Nichols had a  rushing touchdown, and Waddy Kuehl scored a  rushing touchdown. The final score of the game was 45–0. This game was the only one that counted towards the Flyers' standing for the entire 1920 season.

Week 3: vs. Hammond Pros 

October 10, 1920, at Douglas Park

This was the Pros' first game of the 1920 season. There were no scores by either team in the first or third quarters, but the Independents scored 13 points in the second and fourth. Back Fred Chicken scored a  rushing touchdown; back Ray Kuehl scored two touchdowns: a  rushing touchdown and a  receiving touchdown from back Pudge Wyman; and back Gerald Mansfield caught a  receiving touchdown from Wyman. Hammond started to purposely injure their opponents during the game. As a result, Rube Ursella suffered a twisted knee. Duey Lyle was kicked in the face and required seven stitches. Lastly, Ed Healey was kicked in the face and needed five stitches in the cheek.

Week 4: vs. Decatur Staleys 

October 17, 1920, at Douglas Park

In week 4, the Independents played the Decatur Staleys. After two games against non-APFA teams, the Staleys played against an APFA team. Late in the first quarter, the Independents' Freeman Fitzgerald forced a fumble on Jimmy Conzelman; Fitzgerald retrieved it at the  line. The Independents drove the ball down the field, and the Staleys' players were tired. As a result, they called a timeout. The first quarter ended there. Wyman took the next snap and fumbled as he was tackled. George Trafton recovered the ball at the  line. Later in the quarter, Conzelman scored the only touchdown in the game.

In the third quarter, Fred Chicken intercepted a Staley pass on the Independents'  line. Early in the fourth quarter, the Staleys drove to the Independents'  line, where they lined up for a field goal. Wyman blocked the kick, however. The Independents next possession resulted in a punt, and the Staleys started the possession at their own  line. On this possession, Kuehl intercepted a pass. The Independents attempted a Hail Mary pass late in the game, but it was unsuccessful. The game ended a few minutes later with the Staleys with possession.

Week 5: vs. Chicago Cardinals 

October 24, 1920, at Douglas Park

Coming off their first loss of the season, the Independents played against the Chicago Cardinals in week 5, with 4,000 spectators in attendance. The Independents out-gained the Cardinals in yards; the Independents had 263 total yards while the opponent had 153. The only score was in the second quarter when Wyman caught a  receiving touchdown from Nichols, making the final score 7–0. This was the first loss of the season for the Cardinals.

Week 6: vs. Chicago Tigers 

October 31, 1920, at Douglas Park

In week six, the Independents played the Chicago Tigers. The Independents out-gained the Tigers in first downs, 14 to 3. The first score of the game was a  rushing touchdown by Chicken; however, the extra point was missed, so the score was only 6–0. The Tigers took the lead in the second quarter after Dunc Annan had a  rushing touchdown. Chicken ended up having two rushing touchdowns, and Wyman had another rushing touchdown, as the Independents beat the Tigers 20–7.

Week 7: vs. Decatur Staleys 

November 7, 1920, at Douglas Park

On a five-game winning streak, the Staleys played against the Independents again. The game ended in a 0–0 tie. Several injuries occurred throughout the game for the Independents. Sid Nichols, Fred Chicken, and Oke Smith injured their knees on different plays. Harry Gunderson was hit late by George Traften and the former had to get thirteen stitches on his face, and his hand was broken.

Week 8: at Chicago Thorn-Tornadoes 

November 11, 1920, at Monmouth College Athletic Park

In the Independents' first road game of the season, they traveled to Monmouth, Illinois, to play the Chicago Thorns-Tornadoes. The Thorns' players decided to have 10-minute quarters. The game was a tie for the first three quarters. In the fourth quarter, however, Kuehl muffed a punt while standing at his own  line. Mooney of the Thorn-Tornadoes picked up the football and ran it back for a touchdown with only 3 minutes left in the game. At this time, Ursella was substituted for Kuehl. After a kickoff return to the  line, the Independents used Novak, Mansfield, and Jordan to help score before time expired. Ursella kicked the game-tying extra point to end the game a 7–7 tie.

Week 8: vs. Dayton Triangles 

November 14, 1920, at Douglas Park

For their second game in week eight, the Independents played against the Dayton Triangles. The Independents had six players returning from injuries this game. In the first quarter, Rube Ursella for the Independents fumbled a punt on the  line, and the Triangles gained possession. On that possession, Frank Bacon scored a rushing touchdown. The Independents controlled the football for a majority of the second quarter. On their final possession of the half, they traveled to the Triangles'  line, but the referee signaled to end the first half. In the fourth quarter, Ed Novack and Arnold Wyman left the game due to injury. The Triangles scored two passing touchdowns in the final 10 minutes of the game; the first was caught by Dave Reese, and the second was caught by Roudebush.

Week 10: vs. Pittsburgh All-Collegians 

November 28, 1920, at Douglas Park

In their final game that counted for the standings, the Independents played the Pittsburgh All-Collegians. There were three names for this team, the Pittsburgh All-Collegians, the Wheeling Collegians, and the Washington and Jefferson All-Stars. This game was originally supposed to be played against the Canton Bulldogs, but it was cancelled. Most players from the All-Collegians did not show up for the game, and the coach used people from the crowd to form a team. The first score of the game came in the first quarter when Wenig blocked a punt and returned it for a touchdown. The only points the All-Collegians scored was a blocked punt from Morris, who returned it for a touchdown. This was the only points the team scored all year. The game ended with a 48–7 victory for the Independents.

Post season 
Since there were no playoff system in the APFA until 1932, a meeting was held to determine the 1920 APFA Champions. Each team that showed up had a vote to determine the champions. The Akron Pros were awarded the Brunswick-Balke Collender Cup on April 30, 1921. Ties were not counted in standings until 1972, which is why Akron is credited with a 1.000 winning percentage. The Independents tied for fourth place in the standings. The sportswriter Bruce Copeland compiled the All-Pro list for the 1920 season. Denfield, Lyle, and Novak made the first-team; Wenig and Shaw made the second-team; and Buland and Fitzgerald made the third-team. Of all the players on the roster, only Healey has been enshrined in the Pro Football Hall of Fame.

Standings

Roster 

 FB – Fullback
 RT – Right tackle
 LT – Left tackle
 C – Center
 RG – Right guard
 LG – Left guard

Notes

References

External links
Rock Island Independents website
Rock Island Independents at Pro Football Reference

Rock Island Independents seasons
Rock Island Independents
Rock Island